Yelkhovsky (masculine), Yelkhovskaya (feminine), or Yelkhovskoye (neuter) may refer to:
Yelkhovsky District, a district of Samara Oblast, Russia
Yelkhovsky (rural locality), a rural locality (a settlement) in Sverdlovsk Oblast, Russia